"Gonna Get Over You" is a song written and recorded by American singer Sara Bareilles. It was released as the third and final single from her second studio album Kaleidoscope Heart (2010). On September 20, a new version featuring Ryan Tedder was released exclusively on iTunes. Lyrically, the song speaks about getting over an ex-lover and is a "doo-wop pop song." It received a positive reception from most music critics, who noted it as one of the album's highlights and a "harmony post-breakup track." A music video was released on September 20 and is directed by actor Jonah Hill. Mainly, the video consists of a heavily eye-lined, leather jacket-wearing Bareilles as she grooves her way down the supermarket aisle. Later, she's joined by a group of identical leather jacket-wearing pals who dance with her as she grazes the produce section.

Background and reception
"Gonna Get Over You" was written by Bareilles and Sam Farrar, who is the bass guitar player for rock band Phantom Planet. Bareilles recorded a new version featuring additional vocals from OneRepublic's Ryan Tedder. The new version was released as a single on September 20, 2011 exclusively on iTunes. Jon Pareles wrote for The New York Times that "the "post-breakup ballad" is a "finger-snapping, modernized doo-wop concoction" and has "swooping harmonized lines, nonsense-syllable backups, antiphonal choirs and a chorus that revolves around a nugget of self-reliance: 'I’ll be all right, just not tonight/But someday'." Jim Farber of New York Daily News perceived that the track "strikes a marching beat, making a heartbreak song sound like a victory lap." Will Hermes of Rolling Stone considered it the best track on the album, writing that the song is "a playfully sexy bit of doo-wop pop." Allison Stewart of Washington Post called it a "rollicking, harmony-heavy pop song." Megan Vick wrote for Billboard that the song is a "mid-century piano parlor ditty." BBC Music's Mark Beaumont believed that the "hooks that intensify on Gonna Get Over You, which might as well be called Man, I Feel Like Shania."

Music video
A music video for the song was released on September 20, 2011 and was directed by comedian Jonah Hill. Driving up to a Latino supermarket, Sara sports a pompadour and a rad jacket, bent upon converting daily shoppers into a gang of leather-clad dancers.

Background
Bareilles told AOL Music that the clip is, "a mash-up of Grease meets West Side Story meets a little market in East LA." She added: "Jonah and I both wanted it to be a combination of fantasy and reality. Silly, over the top moments that are anchored with authenticity."

Storyline
Rocking a leather jacket and wearing her hair in a ponytail and pompadour, Bareilles is romping around a grocery store. She's dancing from one aisle to another, creating a flash mob with some customers. The surreal scene, however, exists only in her daydream. Instead of being a cool girl who spreads toe-tapping fever to people around her, she's just a nerd who sings and dances awkwardly by herself. None of the customers and the patrons give any indication that they enjoy her impromptu performance. In fact, a security informs her that she makes the other people uncomfortable and tells her to leave the store.

Reception
MTV Buzzworthly Blog's Jenna Hally Rubenstein praised the video, writing that "Sara is rocking out HARD on the dance front and unsurprisingly, girlfriend can move." Hally also said that "her dance moves are amazing."

Chart performance
The song's first appearance was on the Billboard's Adult Pop Songs chart at number thirty-nine. It fell out to number thirty-nine, the next week and it climbed to number thirty-five, so far.

Live performances
Sara has performed the song at Walmart Soundcheck, on September 12, 2010.  She also performed it alongside Cee Lo Green's hit "Forget You" on VEVO at The Warfield in San Francisco, on February 17, 2011.

Charts

References

2011 singles
Doo-wop songs
Sara Bareilles songs
Songs written by Sara Bareilles
Songs written by Sam Farrar
2010 songs
Epic Records singles
Song recordings produced by Neal Avron